Titan was the project name for a cancelled Blizzard Entertainment massively multiplayer online game. With speculation regarding the game beginning in 2007, Blizzard revealed little information besides that it would be completely new and not be based on the company's then-current three main franchises. 

The game was internally canceled by Blizzard in May 2013, though publicly they announced that the project would be delayed as they took the title in a different direction. Its official cancellation was made in September 2014. Internally, about forty members of the Titan project used the developed assets to craft a new game which became Overwatch.

Gameplay 
The exact details of how Titan would have played are not known, but Blizzard's Jeff Kaplan, who served on the Titan development team and later became the director for Overwatch, identified that the game was a "Titan was a class-based MMO and one of the classes was called the Jumper,". Players would have selected a character from several classes, which granted them initial abilities. As they progressed in the game, they would gain points to use to spend on a skill tree for that character. Kaplan said that, near the point of Titan cancellation, the variety of skills they had in the game led to overpowered combinations, and described the result as "very cluttered and confused".

Shortly after the cancellation announcement, Kotaku ran an article in which they described the game as "a massive multiplayer PC game in which players could both maintain non-combat professions and shoot their way through death-matches on a sci-fi version of Earth." According to the article, which was sourced by anonymous employees who worked on the project, the game would take place on a near-future Earth where the player would take on a "mundane job" during the day while fighting enemies at night.

Development 
In 2007, users on a Blizzard Internet forum speculated that the game was in development after the company published job listings for character and environment artists to work on a "Next-Gen MMO" that was "Top Secret." A Blizzard community representative confirmed that the postings were for an unannounced game that was not an expansion for World of Warcraft. Activision Blizzard CEO Bobby Kotick, Blizzard COO Paul Sams, and Blizzard CEO Mike Morhaime all verified that it was a new game in 2008. A confidential project schedule was released without the company's consent in November 2010. It showed a project titled "Titan" with a release date in the fourth quarter of 2013. Blizzard China's general manager either resigned or was terminated after the leak.

At the 2010 Spike Video Game Awards, Blizzard co-founder Frank Pearce told gaming blog Destructoid that the studio had begun talking about the title as a recruitment tool.  Morhaime spoke of the game in broad terms during a panel discussion at the 2011 D.I.C.E. Summit. He said that the company had its most experienced MMO developers working on the project. He explained that they were using lessons from the years of working on World of Warcraft, and he also emphasized the significance of players gaming with people they know as opposed to strangers. Morhaime believed that World of Warcraft and Titan, upon its release, would be able to co-exist on the market. He had made a similar statement in 2008 when he told Wired magazine that the game would be so different that it would not compete.

In an interview with Gamasutra in March 2011, Sams revealed that the game was playable and laid out a vision for the project to "still be growing strong" in ten, fifteen or twenty years, having "set a new mark in the industry." By September 2012, development had grown from small teams focusing on concepts to a team of over 100 people and Blizzard vice president of game design Rob Pardo said that the game was "in the middle of development", noting that it would be a "very big project that's got a long ways to go".

On May 28, 2013, it was reported that development on the project had been rebooted, with seventy percent of the team moving to other Blizzard projects and the release date delayed. Blizzard spokesperson Shon Damron confirmed the development status, stating that the remaining core developers would be working to accommodate new technology into the game. Blizzard president Mike Morhaime stated that the company was in the process of selecting a new direction for the project and re-envisioning what they want the game to be. He said that the game was "unlikely to be a subscription-based MMORPG", and that there were no official announced or projected release dates.  Morhaime noted that Blizzard has gone through this sort of iterative development process with previous games. 

On September 23, 2014, Morhaime revealed in an interview with Polygon that production of Titan had been cancelled. These analysts believed that Blizzard recognized that unless Titan offered something significantly compelling over currently-active competing MMOs, it would not have succeeded in the market, and the decision to cancel the project, despite the cost, was a benefit to the company in the long run. 

In a 2019 interview, following his departure from Blizzard, Morhaime had stated that Titan was cancelled because the company failed to control the scope of the game. He described Titan as essentially being two games developed in parallel, which created development pipeline problems. Part of the team was working to make the game engine support the ambitions for the title, but this left the content developers idle with no tools to create the gameplay. He and the other Blizzard executives decided that it would be better to cancel the title rather than wrangle it down.

Transition to Overwatch
While Blizzard publicly stated that Titan had been delayed in May 2013 as they refocused its development, the game had already been canceled internally. Of the 140 members on the Titan team, only 40 were kept in a group to develop a new intellectual property, while the others were transitioned into other departments within Blizzard.  

The remaining Titan group of 40, which included Kaplan and Chris Metzen, were told they needed to come up with a new idea in about six weeks, or otherwise they too would be transferred to other departments. Taking inspiration from team-based shooters like Team Fortress 2 and the popularity of multiplayer online battle arenas (MOBAs), the team used some of the existing Titan assets to develop a prototype game, where players would select pre-defined hero characters with different types of abilities and skills, and face off in team-based matches. Metzen also said that due to the recent failure of Titan, the group suffered from poor morale, but the idea of a team-based shooter invigorated them, and helped to establish an optimistic narrative taking place in the near-future of Earth, encompassing a range of diverse heroes and characters.  The prototype game proved successful, and the team set off to develop what would become Blizzard's fourth major IP, Overwatch. Some Overwatch assets can be traced to their Titan roots, such as the character Tracer, who originally was one of the skins available for the Jumper class in Titan, and the map "Temple of Anubis" that had been developed for Titan. Overwatch was formally announced on November 7, 2014, and released May 24, 2016.

Morhaime stated in 2019 that the decision to take what they had done for Titan but limit its scope with tighter control as to produce Overwatch was one of the best decisions that Blizzard had made.

References 

Blizzard Entertainment
Cancelled PC games
Massively multiplayer online games
Science fiction video games
Video games developed in the United States